Interstate 605 (abbreviated I-605, officially known as the San Gabriel River Freeway) is a  major north–south auxiliary Interstate Highway in the Greater Los Angeles urban area of Southern California. It runs from I-405 and State Route 22 (SR 22) in Seal Beach to I-210 in Duarte. The San Gabriel River Freeway closely parallels the San Gabriel River for most of its alignment, hence its name, which is one of the few Southern California freeways not named after a city along its route.

Aside from changes to the interchange with I-105 (which did not open until the early 1990s), and the addition of an HOV lane between I-405 and I-10, I-605 is one of the only remaining freeways that kept its original alignment throughout its run through Los Angeles County since it first opened.

Route description
The California Streets and Highways Code defines Route 605 as "(a) Route 1 near Seal Beach to Route 405. (b) Route 405 to Route 210 near Duarte." However, the portion in subsection A has yet to be constructed.

The southern terminus of I-605 is at the San Diego (I-405) and Garden Grove (SR 22) Freeways in Seal Beach. From there, it runs roughly north through the Gateway Cities of the Los Angeles Basin. It then shifts north-northeast, crossing the Whittier Narrows and across the San Gabriel Valley. I-605 then ends at its junction with the Foothill Freeway, (I-210) in Duarte, a small city located at the foothills of the San Gabriel Mountains.

I-605 follows most of the length of the San Gabriel River from the San Diego Freeway in Seal Beach to the Santa Fe Dam. Typically dry riverbed and flood basins are visible from many portions of the route, especially near the northern terminus.

In the mid 2000s, a HOV lane was added for motorists with two or more people to use between I-405 and I-10. The HOV lane ends at I-10 and there are no plans to extend it to I-210 at this time. With the addition of the HOV lane, the left shoulder was eliminated to avoid massive costs to widen the freeway. The highway also suffers from traffic jams regularly, especially the junction with I-5 (the Santa Ana Freeway). Newer signs with exit numbers replaced the older signs between the Orange County line and I-10 in 2016, with the completion of the I-605 and I-10 junction improvement. Guide signs along I-605 never included destinations (control cities) such as "Seal Beach" or "Irwindale" since its opening. Rather, cardinal directions ("NORTH" or "SOUTH"), and a simple "THRU TRAFFIC" designation in place of control cities, are used on signs along I-605 itself.

I-605 is part of the California Freeway and Expressway System, and is part of the National Highway System, a network of highways that are considered essential to the country's economy, defense, and mobility by the Federal Highway Administration. I-605 from I-405 to I-10 is known as the San Gabriel River Freeway, as named by Senate Bill 99, Chapter 1101 in 1967.

History

In 1957, the number for this route was proposed as I-13, as it is positioned approximately midway between I-5 and I-15 (although it intersects the former). That number was rejected, as was the second proposed number, I-102. Finally, the designation I-605 was accepted in 1958.

I-605 began construction in 1963 and the first section was opened in 1964 from I-405 to SR 60. The newest section (extension to I-210) was opened in 1971 was originally signed as SR 243. There are plans to extend it to SR 1 further south in Orange County as SR 605, but strong community opposition means that it is unlikely that the alignment will ever be built.

This proposal was rejected due to strong community opposition, in particular due to the fact that it would have led to the destruction of houses in Downey, California.

Exit list

See also

References

External links

California @ AARoads.com - I-605
Caltrans: Route 605 highway conditions
California Highways: I-605

605
05-6
6 California
Interstate 05-6
Interstate 05-6
05-6
San Gabriel River (California)
San Gabriel Valley
Irwindale, California
Lakewood, California